Somillus is a genus of flies in the family Dolichopodidae.

Species
Somillus longihirtus (Van Duzee, 1930)
Somillus melanosoma Brèthes, 1924

References

Dolichopodidae genera
Diptera of South America
Taxa named by Juan Brèthes